DYBM-TV, is a commercial television station of Philippine television network GTV, owned by Citynet Network Marketing and Productions, a subsidiary of GMA Network Inc. Its transmitter are located in Barangay San Antonio, Sibulan, Negros Oriental, Philippines. It served as a repeater of GTV Cebu.

See also
DYLS-TV
GTV
List of GTV stations

Television stations in Dumaguete
Television stations in Negros Oriental
Television channels and stations established in 1997
GTV (Philippine TV network) stations